holders of a United States passport may travel to 186 countries and territories without a travel visa, or with a visa on arrival. The United States passport currently ranks 7th in terms of travel freedom (tied with the passports of Belgium, New Zealand, Norway, Switzerland and the Czech Republic) according to the Henley Passport Index. It is also ranked 3rd by the Global Passport Power Rank.

Visa requirements map

Visa requirements
General visa requirements of sovereign countries towards United States citizens:

Territories or administrative subdivisions with different visa policies 
Visa requirements for United States citizens for visits to various territories, disputed areas, partially recognized countries not mentioned in the list above, recognized administrative subdivisions that operate on different visa policies and restricted zones:

Pre-approved visas pick-up
Pre-approved visas can be picked up on arrival in the following countries instead in embassy or consulate.

Passport card
The United States Passport Card can be used as an alternative to the passport booklet only when travelling to and from Canada, Mexico, Bermuda, and Caribbean islands at maritime ports-of-entry or land border crossings. The card is not valid for international air travel whatsoever; if traveling by air, the passport book is required.

APEC Travel Business Card
The APEC Business Travel Card (ABTC) is meant to facilitate travel for U.S. citizens engaged in verified business in the APEC region.

The U.S. ABTC should enable access to a dedicated fast-track lane for expedited immigration processing at some participating foreign APEC member airports. U.S. APEC Business Travel Card holders may also use the Global Entry kiosks at participating airports upon their U.S. return. However, as the U.S. is a transitional member of the ABTC scheme, the U.S. APEC Business Travel Card cannot be used in lieu of a visa to enter an APEC member country. The program was initially set to expire on September 30, 2018, but the November 2017 signing of the Asia-Pacific Economic Cooperation Business Travel Cards Act of 2017 (S. 504) ensured it would permanently remain.

Consular protection of U.S. citizens abroad

The United States has the second most diplomatic missions of any country in the world.

See also List of diplomatic missions of the United States and List of diplomatic missions in the United States.

The Department of State regularly publishes travel warnings or travel alerts.

Non-visa restrictions

Foreign travel statistics

See also

 Visa policy of the United States
 United States passport
 Bureau of Consular Affairs
 United States Passport Card
 List of nationalities forbidden at border

Notes

References

External links
Official U.S. Government database, Bureau of Consular Affairs, U.S. Department of State

United States of America
Foreign relations of the United States